Anopyxis is a genus of plant in family Rhizophoraceae, with 3 species.

References

Rhizophoraceae
Taxonomy articles created by Polbot